Racheal Lynn Woodward (born May 4, 1994), better known as RaeLynn, is an American singer and songwriter who was a contestant on The Voice in season two (2012). She was eliminated in the quarterfinals.

Early life
RaeLynn was born and raised in Baytown, Texas, and at age 15 wanted a career in music. She graduated high school early, in 2010.

Career

2012: The Voice
RaeLynn auditioned for the second season of The Voice after being encouraged by a contestant on Team Adam who wrote songs with her. Her audition song was "Hell on Heels" by Pistol Annies, Miranda Lambert's group. Both Adam Levine and Blake Shelton wanted her on their team, but she eventually chose Team Blake. She sang "Free Fallin'" against Adley Stump in the Battle Rounds and won. Her victory was, however, highly contested, and Blake publicly defended his choice in a Twitter war. She then went on to the live shows to perform "Wake Up Call" by Maroon 5 and "She's Country" by Jason Aldean and the latter later became her best selling cover on the show. For her last-chance performance, she sang "If I Die Young" by The Band Perry, but was not chosen over Erin Willett and thus eliminated.

Performances on The Voice

2012–2018: After The Voice and WildHorse
As of 2012, she was signed to Republic Nashville. She has written songs with Natalie Hemby, Jon Randall, John Wiggins, and fellow Voice contestants Nicolle Galyon and Hailey Steele.

She has performed a song co-written with Miranda Lambert entitled "Lie", and returned with fellow finalists Chris Mann and Juliet Simms to perform at the semifinal results show on the third season of The Voice, performing her new single, "Boyfriend". "Boyfriend" later charted on the Bubbling Under Hot 100 Singles chart, which acts as a 25-song extension to the Hot 100, thus making her the first contestant to chart on one of Billboard's overall singles charts for post-Voice activity. The single sold 27,000 copies in its debut week.

She performed backing vocals for Blake Shelton's 2013 single, "Boys 'Round Here", which debuted at No. 67 on the U.S. Billboard Hot 100 chart, and peaked at No. 16. The song is also featured on Shelton's album, Based on a True Story…. She was signed to Dr. Luke's publishing label Prescription Songs in April 2013.

RaeLynn's debut single to country radio, "God Made Girls", was released on July 1, 2014. On December 2, 2014, she performed her single on season seven of The Voice. It went on to be a Top 10 hit on the Billboard Hot Country Songs chart and a Top 20 hit on the Billboard Country Airplay charts, and was certified Gold by the RIAA. On January 13, 2015, RaeLynn released an EP through Valory Music Co. titled Me, which debuted at No. 49 on the Billboard 200, and No. 7 on the Top Country Albums chart, with 5,500 copies sold in its first week. "For a Boy" was released on March 23, 2015 as RaeLynn's second single to country radio. It was less successful than its predecessor and a year later, in April 2016, it was announced that RaeLynn had parted ways with Valory Music Co., leaving her debut album delayed until 2017.

On June 7, 2016, it was announced that RaeLynn had signed a new record deal with Warner Bros. Nashville. "Love Triangle" was released on July 11, 2016 as her first single for the label. It served as the lead-off to her debut album, WildHorse, which was released on March 24, 2017. Sounds Like Nashville praised RaeLynn's "standout debut" and called its lead single, "Love Triangle", "country music storytelling at its finest and country radio is better because of it."

WildHorse landed within the Top 10 on Billboard’s All-Genre Album Sales Chart and debuted at No.1 on the Billboard Country Albums Chart, marking the first female country artist to do so since Maren Morris' debut HERO.

2019—present: Label change
On November 8, 2019, she released the single "Bra Off" and announced that she had signed to Florida Georgia Line's Round Here Records. "Keep Up" followed in February 2020, and was sent to country radio as her first single under the label in April 2020.

Personal life
In October 2015, RaeLynn became engaged to then-financial advisor Joshua Davis. They were married on February 27, 2016. A year after their wedding, RaeLynn revealed that Davis had enlisted in the military. In May 2021, the couple announced that they were expecting their first child, a daughter. She gave birth on September 8, 2021 to daughter Daisy Rae.

She has type 1 diabetes.

Discography

Studio albums

Compilation albums

Extended plays

Singles

Notes

Single releases from The Voice

Other charted songs

Guest appearances

Music videos

Tours
2015: Platinum Tour 
2015: Roadside Bars & Pink Guitars Tour 
2015: Riot Tour 
2016: Blake Shelton 2016 Tour 
2017: Doing It to Country Songs Tour 
2019: Girl: The World Tour

Television

Awards and nominations

References

External links

1994 births
21st-century American singers
American country singer-songwriters
American women country singers
Living people
People from Baytown, Texas
People with type 1 diabetes
Singer-songwriters from Texas
The Voice (franchise) contestants
21st-century American women singers
Country musicians from Texas